Sir Charles Peter Layard (5 December 1849 – 8 June 1915) was the 18th chief justice of Ceylon from 1902 to 1906.

Charles Peter Layard was born on 5 December 1849 in Colombo, the youngest of nine children, to Charles Peter Layard (1806–1893) and Louisa Anne née Edwards (1809–1886), who hailed from a distinguished family, whose earlier relatives migrated to Ceylon. His father was a civil servant and first mayor of Colombo.

Layard was appointed chief justice on 21 March 1902, upon the retirement of John Winfield Bonser, and took up the position on 26 April 1902. He was one of the first chief justices produced by the local bar, and served until he was succeeded by Joseph Turner Hutchinson in June 1906.

References

Chief Justices of British Ceylon
Puisne Justices of the Supreme Court of Ceylon
L
20th-century Sri Lankan people
19th-century Sri Lankan people
Sri Lankan people of British descent
19th-century British people
British Ceylon judges
1849 births
1916 deaths
Attorneys General of British Ceylon
Alumni of St John's College, Cambridge